Elizabeth Island lies just south of French Island in Western Port, Victoria, south-eastern Australia, and just north of Phillip Island. Once used for farming, it has been converted into a holiday retreat, with the establishment of a pier and housing facilities. Access is via boat or helicopter.

Environment 
It is covered mostly in native grass, with areas of native trees and shrubs, and a few large pine trees. There are a variety of bird species on and around the island. The area off the north eastern coast provides a feeding ground for native birds, including swans, when the tide is very low. The white-bellied sea eagle can be seen on the island at times, and nests on nearby French Island. The shoreline consists of pebblestone beach, with small areas of mangroves, sandstone, larger rocks, and some small areas of sand. There are a number of rock pools. The southern part of the island provides constant deep-water access and is close to a deep-water channel where various sea life is found. The island has direct access to Westernport Bay. There is a small rocky peninsula on the south eastern corner of the island, with mangroves and grasses. This area becomes separated at high tide.

History 
The island bears the remnants of a shipwreck on its western beach, believed to be the rescue boat off a German ship.  A former owner crashed his airplane on French Island attempting to view Elizabeth Island, having recently purchased it in a bar.

References

External links
Department Of Primary Industries - Victorian Resources Online
Official Website

Unincorporated areas of Victoria (Australia)
Islands of Victoria (Australia)
Western Port
Islands of Australia (tenure: freehold)
Private islands of Australia